is a 2019 Japanese animated film co-produced by Trigger and XFLAG. It was directed by Hiroyuki Imaishi and written by Kazuki Nakashima. It features character and mecha designs by Shigeto Koyama, 3DCG animation by Sanzigen, and music by Hiroyuki Sawano. The film was released on May 24, 2019 in Japan, by Toho Animation. At the 2019 Annecy International Animation Film Festival, the film was selected as one of the ten films. It was nominated for Best Animated Feature — Independent at the 47th Annie Awards, but lost to Jérémy Clapin's I Lost My Body.

Plot
During a calamity known as the Great World Blaze, fires from mass spontaneous human combustions killed half the world's population. Certain humans developed pyrokinetic abilities during and subsequent to the event, and become known as the Burnish.

Thirty years later, Galo Thymos is a member of the firefighting group Burning Rescue living in the city of Promepolis. The team responds to incidents involving Mad Burnish, a group of radical Burnish accused of being terrorists. As Galo succeeds in the mission of taking down the Mad Burnish, including their leader, Lio Fotia, they are sent to prison by Freeze Force, a police force owned by the city governor, Kray Foresight. However, Lio and the other Burnish prisoners break themselves free, and escape to a cave near a frozen lake, where Galo just happens to be nearby. He sees Lio failing to revive a mortally injured Burnish using a mouth-to-mouth flame transfer technique. Before they escape, Lio tells Galo that Kray is capturing Burnish for human experiments, shocking Galo as he worshipped Kray after the latter saved his life several years ago.

After Galo confronts Kray, he informs him that the Earth will soon be destroyed by an uncontrollable surge of magma from the earth's core. He reveals that the abilities of the Burnish can be used to create a warp drive, which he intends to use to flee Earth with a select portion of humanity. Galo objects to this plan, but Kray orders the soldiers to arrest Galo for treason.

Meanwhile, Freeze Force manage to track down and recapture all of the Burnish population but Lio, who is sent into a nearby volcano by his companions. Infuriated by the abuse done toward his people, Lio unleashes all his hatred, turning into a giant flame dragon and burning down the city, with the intention of confronting Kray. Galo escapes from prison, and with the help of Burning Rescue, intervenes in the conflict, restraining and cooling him down enough, as Galo's colleague, Aina Ardebit, sends them off to the frozen lake.

The flames melt the ice and reveal a laboratory run by a holographic projection of Deus Prometh, a scientist killed by Kray. Deus explains that the Burnish can communicate with the Promare, a race of inter-dimensional flame beings residing in Earth's core after a dimension rift opened shortly before the Great World Blaze. The Promare naturally desire to burn, an instinct inherited by the Burnish. The surging magma is a side effect of subjecting the Promare to pain, and Kray's experiments on the Burnish using incomplete, stolen technology are accelerating its growth. He proceeds to reveal the collective agony caused by the Promare-powered warp drive will cause the Earth's immediate destruction.

In a mecha of Deus' design, known as the Deus X Machina, Galo and Lio return to the city to confront Kray. After seemingly destroying the ship and warp drive during the battle, Kray reveals that he is a Burnish, and was also the one who indirectly started the fire he forcefully rescued Galo from, using it as the start of his political uprising, and only recommending Galo to join Burning Rescue in order to let him die. Kray seemingly kills Galo and takes Lio to use him to power the warp drive. However, Lio's flame had managed to save Galo, and using a drill designed by Prometh, Galo makes it to the core of the ship in time. Using Lio's flame, he defeats Kray, and while Lio is nearly killed due to the warp drive, Galo revives him using the mouth-to-mouth technique.

Having fused with the Earth's core, Lio convinces Galo to combine the drive with the mecha to protect life on Earth while allowing the Promare to envelop the surface, causing the Promare to burn completely and harmlessly, satisfying their natural urge and allowing the rift in the core to close. The Burnish become normal humans, and Galo and Lio resolve to rebuild the world together.

Voice cast

Music

The soundtrack is composed by Hiroyuki Sawano, with the album published by Aniplex on May 24, 2019.

Production
The film was announced at Anime Expo on July 2, 2017 as an original anime project co-produced by Studio Trigger and XFLAG that has been in production for over four years, later revealed to be a film in October 2018. Hiroyuki Imaishi and Kazuki Nakashima worked together previously on Gurren Lagann and Kill la Kill. Nakashima and Trigger are credited for the original work, with Shigeto Koyama providing the character and mechanical designs, Sanzigen animating the 3DCG sequences and Hiroyuki Sawano composing the music. The film's logo is designed by Saishi Ichiko and Tomotaka Kubo is serving as art director. Sushio, who designed the characters and served as chief animation director on Kill la Kill, is involved as one of the film's animators.

Release
The film premiered in Japan on May 24, 2019. On June 13, 2019, GKIDS acquired the film for North American distribution, with showings occurring on September 17 and 19, 2019. It was dubbed into English by NYAV Post. The film was later released again with showings on December 8, 10, and 11, 2019, where it also aired a short prequel film Side: Galo. Another showing of the film in North America was expected to re-air April 7 and 8, 2020 with the two prequel films Side: Galo and Side: Lio, and a message from Imaishi. However, the third screening in North America was postponed during COVID-19 pandemic. It was later rescheduled to September 16 and 19, 2021, along with Takashi Yamazaki's Lupin III: The First. To promote the upcoming European release, Trigger partnered with Goodsmile Racing and Black Falcon team to field a Mercedes-AMG GT3 with Promare livery in the 2019 Spa 24 Hours endurance race. The car started on pole position and finished 3rd. In the United Kingdom and Ireland, Anime Limited acquired the film, and premiered it at Scotland Loves Anime in Glasgow on October 13, 2019, and a special screening in Edinburgh on October 19, 2019 with director Hiroyuki Imaishi, creative producer Hiromi Wakabayashi, and character designer Shigeto Koyama. In Australia and New Zealand Madman Entertainment premiered the film at Madman Anime Festival Melbourne on September 14, 2019.

Home media
The film was released in Japan on Blu-ray and DVD on February 5, 2020. Originally set for a May 5, 2020 digital home media release in North America, the film was released by GKIDS and Shout! Factory digitally on April 21, 2020. A Blu-ray and DVD release followed on May 19, 2020.

Reception

Box office
The film ranked at number 8 in the Japanese box office on an opening weekend, grossing  in its first three days. In its third weekend, the film dropped out of the top 10 and accumulated . The film went on to gross  in Japan, becoming the 23rd highest-grossing Japanese film of 2019.

Critical response
The site's critics consensus reads, "Visually dazzling and narratively exhilarating, Promare is a colorful thrill ride that should entertain adult anime enthusiasts as well as the teens in its target audience." On Metacritic, the film has a weighted average score of 77 out of 100 based on 8 critics, indicating "generally favorable reviews."

Matt Schley of The Japan Times gave the film 4 stars out of 5, praising the storytelling but having some criticism for elements of the transition between 2D and 3D animation.

Writing for Anime News Network, Kim Morrissy gave Promare a Grade A. Comparing it to previous works by Gainax and Trigger such as Gurren Lagann and Kill la Kill. Morrissy claimed that: "Promare is a refinement of the Trigger formula to the point where I honestly believe it has outdone the classics that inspired it."

Gadget Tsūshin listed "Annihilation Beam", a phrase from the film, in their 2019 anime buzzwords list.

Accolades

Notes

References

External links
  
 
 
 
 
 
 
 

2019 anime films
2019 films
2019 science fiction action films
2010s animated superhero films
2010s Japanese superhero films
2010s science fiction comedy films
2010s superhero comedy films
Animated post-apocalyptic films
Anime composed by Hiroyuki Sawano
Anime films composed by Hiroyuki Sawano
Anime with original screenplays
Aniplex
Films about arson
Films about firefighting
Films about terrorism
Films directed by Hiroyuki Imaishi
Fiction about government
Japanese action comedy films
Japanese animated science fiction films
Japanese animated superhero films
2010s Japanese-language films
Japanese post-apocalyptic films
Japanese science fiction action films
Japanese science fiction comedy films
Mecha films
Toho animated films
Studio Trigger
4DX films